Şennur Demir (born 10 August 1982) is a Turkish retired female boxer competed in the heavyweight (+81 kg) division. She is from Bartın.

As well as a kickboxer, she turned pro in 2011 after she won the golden belt national title in K-1.

She won the silver medal at the 2011 Women's European Union Amateur Boxing Championships held in Katowice, Poland.

References

1982 births
AIBA Women's World Boxing Championships medalists
Turkish women boxers
Turkish female kickboxers
People from Bartın
Living people
Heavyweight boxers
Heavyweight kickboxers
20th-century Turkish sportswomen
21st-century Turkish sportswomen